Churchstanton is a village and civil parish in Somerset, England, situated within the Blackdown Hills Area of Outstanding Natural Beauty, on the River Otter  south of Taunton in the Somerset West and Taunton district.

The parish has a population of 752. The parish includes the hamlets of Churchinford and Burnworthy where Burnworthy Lodge dates from the 16th century and has been designated by English Heritage as a grade II listed building.

History

The village was known as Cheristone meaning stony settlement where cherries grow, in the 13th century.

Until 1896 the village was within Hemyock Hundred in the county of Devon. It was then transferred into Somerset.

Governance

The parish council has responsibility for local issues, including setting an annual precept (local rate) to cover the council's operating costs and producing annual accounts for public scrutiny. The parish council evaluates local planning applications and works with the local police, district council officers, and neighbourhood watch groups on matters of crime, security, and traffic. The parish council's role also includes initiating projects for the maintenance and repair of parish facilities, as well as consulting with the district council on the maintenance, repair, and improvement of highways, drainage, footpaths, public transport, and street cleaning. Conservation matters (including trees and listed buildings) and environmental issues are also the responsibility of the council.

The village falls within the non-metropolitan district of Somerset West and Taunton, which was established on 1 April 2019. It was previously in the district of Taunton Deane, which was formed on 1 April 1974 under the Local Government Act 1972, and part of Taunton Rural District before that. The district council is responsible for local planning and building control, local roads, council housing, environmental health, markets and fairs, refuse collection and recycling, cemeteries and crematoria, leisure services, parks, and tourism.

Somerset County Council is responsible for running the largest and most expensive local services such as education, social services, libraries, main roads, public transport, policing and fire services, trading standards, waste disposal and strategic planning.

It is also part of the Taunton Deane county constituency represented in the House of Commons of the Parliament of the United Kingdom. It elects one Member of Parliament (MP) by the first past the post system of election, and was part of the South West England constituency of the European Parliament prior to Britain leaving the European Union in January 2020, which elected seven MEPs using the d'Hondt method of party-list proportional representation.

State Education for the children of the village up to aged 11 is provided by a Somerset County Council Primary School. Churchstanton Primary School. State Secondary education for the Somerset children is provided at The Castle School in Taunton or for the Devon children, Uffculme Secondary School. As with may small primary schools the pressure is on the Governors to join an academy trust. There are a number of potential suitors locally, including The Castle Partnership Trust (Taunton / Wellington) or the Redstart Academies Trust (Chard). See external link to Churchstanton Primary School below for access to Governors meeting notes

Community Resources

The people of the Parish and adjoining area own and manage a successful Community Shop. In addition to selling local produce, it has a Post office counter service, alcohol licence and a coffee shop. There is a public open space on the edge of the village which is managed by a committed group of volunteers. The area provides recreational facilities for residents to play field games, walk, picnic and have an allotment.
There is a Village Hall, again run by volunteers. The hall is used for community events and meetings as well as being available to rent for private events and entertainment. Periodically films are shown and there is a monthly produce market.

Geography

Quants Reserve is a nature reserve north west of the village which consists of a grassland clearing in a forestry plantation. It is well known for its butterflies — among the species which occur are Duke of Burgundy, marsh fritillary and wood white. In 1988 an area of 50.6 hectares (126.0 acres) was designated as a Biological Site of Special Scientific Interest.

Ringdown is a biological Site of Special Scientific Interest where outcrops of both Cretaceous Upper Greensand and underlying Triassic Keuper Marls occur. Amongst the vegetation present are two species which are very restricted in South West Britain, white beaksedge (Rhynchospora alba) and dioecious sedge (Carex dioica). This site is the only known location for the latter in Somerset. A colony of the small pearl-bordered fritillary (Boloria selene) is found here.

To the east of Churchinford village lies a local nature reserve set around two lakes f the former landscaped gardens of Otterhead House which was demolished in 1952. The estate was developed in Victorian times and by 1890 included over 1700 acres of land. The Reserve was designated as a LNR in 2008. It is managed and leased from Wessex Water by the not for profit Otterhead Estate Trust Co Ltd. The company was set up in 2008 to conserve and part restore the built heritage features on site as well as continuing the work of the Somerset wildlife Trust who used to manage the reserve.

The main feature of the LNR is the valley of the River otter, in which the former Victorian estate had created a flight of five lakes and a complicated system of leats, weirs and pumps. Today only two of the lakes survive.

A range of semi-natural habitats make up the reserve including alder and willow carr, dry deciduous woodland, unimproved neutral grassland, and freshwater streams and ditches. Dormice, badgers and bat species occur in the woodland. The lakes supports bird species including kingfisher, dipper and wagtail. 
Visitors should keep to clearly visible paths as dangerous deep silt is found in former lakebeds and leats. Naturally occurring spring line mires can be equally dangerous to everyone though small children and dogs would be particularly at risk if leaving the visible paths. Please remember that the lakes provide drinking water for Taunton and that nesting birds will be present in the woodland during summer months and dogs should be kept on a lead.

Religious sites

The parish Church of St Peter and St Paul dates from the 14th century and has been designated as a grade I listed building.

References

External links

 Churchstanton Parish Council
 Churchstanton Primary School
 Otterhead Lakes

Villages in Taunton Deane
Civil parishes in Somerset